Arnis Līcītis (8 January 1946 – 21 January 2022) was a Latvian actor.

Life and career
Born in Riga in 1946, Līcītis was the son of actors  and Helga Līcīte. He attended secondary school at Riga State Gymnasium No.1 and subsequently graduated from the Jāzeps Vītols Latvian Academy of Music. He then began working for the Riga Film Studio in 1965.

Līcītis died on 21 January 2022, at the age of 76.

Filmography
 (1965)
 (1968)
 (1972)
 (1974)
The Favorite (1976)
 (1980)
Long Road in the Dunes (1981)
 (1983)
 (1984)
 (1984)
 (1988)
 (1991)
Musketeers Twenty Years After (1992)
Dangerous Summer (2000)

References

1946 births
2022 deaths
20th-century Latvian male actors
Latvian male film actors
Latvian Academy of Music alumni
Actors from Riga